The data processing inequality is an information theoretic concept which states that the information content of a signal cannot be increased via a local physical operation.  This can be expressed concisely as 'post-processing cannot increase information'.

Definition
Specifically, we have such a Markov chain if the joint probability mass function can be written as
 

Using the mutual information, this can be written as :

Proof
One can apply the chain rule for mutual information to obtain two different decompositions of :

See also
 Garbage in, garbage out

References

External links
http://www.scholarpedia.org/article/Mutual_information

Data processing